Rastagar is a surname. Notable people with the surname include: 

Farid Rastagar (born 1963), Afghani singer 
Wajiha Rastagar (born 1967), Afghani singer